Lambton Shores is a municipality in Lambton County, Ontario, Canada, that is on the southern shores of Lake Huron.

History
Lambton Shores was formed in 2001 when the Township of Bosanquet was amalgamated with the town of Forest, and the villages of Arkona, Grand Bend and Thedford.

Climate
Lambton Shores is one of the more southerly municipalities in Canada, and therefore receives relatively warmer temperatures.

Communities
The main communities in Lambton Shores are Arkona, Forest, Grand Bend, Port Franks and Thedford. Smaller communities include Cedarview, Glendale Beach, Kettle and Stoney Point, Ipperwash Beach, Lake Valley Grove, Jericho, Jura, Kinnaird, Northville, Ravenswood, Southcott Pines, Springvale, Sunnidale, Walden Place and Walker Woods.  The administrative offices of the township are located in Thedford.

Arkona

Arkona is a community located in the municipality of Lambton Shores in southwestern Ontario near the Lambton–Middlesex county line, situated beside the Ausable River, on Former Kings Highway 79 (now Lambton County Road 79), Arkona is  roughly halfway between Thedford, and Watford.

Forest

Forest is situated on what was once dense forest. When the Grand Trunk Railway was built through where the town now sits, the station was named for the dense forest. Hickory Creek, which meanders through the town, provided water for the station in those days when wood and water were essential to the operation of steam locomotives.

Grand Bend

The settlement began in the 1830s when a group of English and Scottish settlers bought lots from the Canada Company, a land development firm. One of the original settlers, Benjamin Brewster gave his name to the village after he and his business partner David Smart secured rights to dam the Ausable River and started a sawmill in 1832. The villagers were mainly the families of the millhands and fisherman. Their homesteads were situated on the south side of the present village.

Thedford

Thedford is a small community in northwestern Lambton County, Ontario Canada, situated 8 km south of Kings Highway 21, along Lambton CR 79 (Former Kings Highway 79). The community began in the 1860s when farmer Nelson Southworth, a native of Vermont, agreed to donate land for the construction of a Grand Trunk Railway station, with the condition that he would be able to name it. Southworth chose the name "Thetford", as a way of honouring Thetford, Vermont, a community in his home state in the United States. A local clerk's poor hand writing was mistaken for the current spelling, which is how it first appeared on official records. The Thedford Raiders Hockey Team once held the World Record for Longest Continuous Hockey Game, which was also a fundraiser for juvenile diabetes. A plaque at the entrance of the town heralds it as the "Onion Capital of Canada".

A designated place within the municipality of Lambton Shores, Thedford had a population of 822 in the Canada 2006 Census.

Thedford telephone numbers start with 519-296.

Demographics 

Media
Lambton Shores has two radio stations:

90.5 myFM Exeter/Grand Bend Local News
CKTI-FM, a First Nations station from Kettle Point
VFR895, a race info station from Grand Bend Motorplex

Lambton Shores has two newspapers:

Lakeshore Advance, owned by Sun Media
Standard Guide Advocate, owned by Hayter Walden Publications

See also
List of townships in Ontario

Notes

References

External links

Lower-tier municipalities in Ontario
Municipalities in Lambton County
2001 establishments in Ontario